Cochise College Airport  is a public use airport located  west of the Central business district of Douglas, in Cochise County, Arizona, United States. Cochise College Airport is used by Cochise College's aviation program.

Facilities and aircraft 
It has one runway:
 5/23 is 5,303 by 72 feet (1,616 x 22 m) with an asphalt surface.

For the 12-month period ending April 16, 2008, the airport had 47,000 general aviation aircraft operations, an average of 129 per day. At that time there were 15 aircraft based at this airport: 14 single-engine and 1 multi-engine.

References

External links 

 

Airports in Cochise County, Arizona
University and college airports
Airport
Douglas, Arizona
University and college buildings in the United States